Mohamed Béavogui (born 15 August 1953 in Porédaka) is a Guinean diplomat and politician, and the former interim prime minister of Guinea from 6 October 2021 to 17 July 2022.

Biography 
Béavogui was born in August 1953 in Porédaka, the son of a diplomat, and the nephew of former Chairperson of the African Union Commission, Diallo Telli. He began studying at Gamal Abdel Nasser University of Conakry in 1972. He then earned a master's degree in engineering from the Kalinin Politechnical Institute in the Soviet Union, and a degree in executive management from the John F. Kennedy School of Government at Harvard University in the United States.

From 1982 to 1986, he worked in Nigeria, before being recruited as a consultant by the Food and Agriculture Organization of the United Nations. In 2001, he was named the Regional Director for West and Central Africa for the International Fund for Agricultural Development (IFAD), a post he held until 2011. In October 2011, he became the Director of Partnership and Resource Mobilization and Senior Advisor to the President of IFAD. In 2015, he was named director of the African Capacity Building Foundation.

Prime Minister 

On 6 October 2021, a month after the 2021 Guinean coup d'état, he was named transitional prime minister of Guinea by interim president Mamady Doumbouya.

References 

1953 births
Living people
Gamal Abdel Nasser University of Conakry alumni
Peter the Great St. Petersburg Polytechnic University alumni
Prime Ministers of Guinea
21st-century Guinean politicians